Groundswell may refer to:
 Swell (ocean), a type of ocean wave

Music
 Groundswell (album), a 2003 album by Parts & Labor, or its title song
 Three Days Grace or Groundswell, a Canadian rock band 
 Groundswell, a band created by Jonn Penney

Other uses
 Ground Swell, a 1939 painting by Edward Hopper
 Groundswell (organization), a non-profit organization based in Washington, D.C.
 Groundswell (book), a 2008 book by Charlene Li and Josh Bernoff
 Groundswell: The Second Diva Book of Short Stories
 Groundswell group, a political action group
 Groundswell NZ, a farming advocacy and protest group in New Zealand